The 2001 Potton municipal election took place on November 4, 2001, to elect a mayor and councillors in Potton, Quebec.

Results

André Marcoux was the mayor of Potton from 1977 to 1989 and again from 1993 to 2001. He lost to his cousin Jacques Marcoux in the 1989 municipal election, but regained the mayoralty four years later. In 2000, he promoted a plan for a new community centre that he said could be accomplished with assistance from the federal and provincial governments and without a tax increase. The federal and provincial governments declined to fund the centre in 2002, following Marcoux's defeat. He is not to be confused with another André Marcoux who has served as mayor of Donnacona.

Source: "Election 2001 Sherbrooke & Townships," Sherbrooke Record, 6 November 2001, p. 5.

References

2001 Quebec municipal elections
November 2001 events in Canada